Go Go Swing Live is a live album recorded and released in 1986 by the Washington, D.C.-based go-go band Chuck Brown & the Soul Searchers. The album was recorded at the Crystal Skate (in Temple Hills, Maryland) and at the RSVP (a defunct nightclub in Washington, D.C.)

The album consists of go-go renditions of classic jazz and swing songs performed with a go-go beat. The album is especially known for remakes of the calypso song "Run Joe", and the swing songs "Stormy Monday" and "It Don't Mean a Thing". The album was ranked #1 as the "Best Album Recorded in D.C." by DCist.

Track listing

Personnel
 Chuck Brown – lead vocals, electric guitar
 Ricardo D. Wellman – drums
 Rowland Smith – congas, backing vocals
 Glenn Ellis – bass guitar, percussion
 Curtis Johnson – keyboards
 John M. Buchannan – keyboards, trombone
 Leroy Fleming – tenor saxophone, backing vocals
 Donald Tillery – trumpet, tambourine, backing vocals

References

External links
Go Go Swing Live at Discogs.com

1986 live albums
Chuck Brown albums
Live rhythm and blues albums
Live jazz-funk albums